The 2012 Australian Goldfields Open was a professional ranking snooker tournament that took place between 9–15 July 2012 at the Bendigo Stadium in Bendigo, Australia. It was the second ranking event of the 2012/2013 season.

Stuart Bingham was the defending champion, but he lost in the first round 4–5 against Matthew Selt.

Barry Hawkins won his first ranking title by defeating Peter Ebdon 9–3 in the final.

Prize fund
The breakdown of prize money for this year is shown below:

Winner: A$70,000
Runner-up: $30,000
Semi-final: $20,000
Quarter-final: $15,000
Last 16: $10,000
Last 32: $7,500
Last 48: $2,000

Non-televised highest break: $500
Televised highest break: $2,500
Total: $435,000

Wildcard round
These matches were played in Bendigo on 9 July.

Main draw

Final

Qualifying
These matches were held between 12 and 15 June 2012 at the World Snooker Academy in Sheffield, England.

Century breaks

Qualifying stage centuries

 142, 116, 102  Barry Pinches
 140  Mitchell Mann
 136, 109  Xiao Guodong
 134, 121, 101  Marco Fu
 130, 101  Cao Yupeng
 130, 101  Jimmy Robertson
 126, 121  Liu Chuang
 119  Ken Doherty
 114, 112  Liang Wenbo
 113  Tony Drago

 112  James Wattana
 108  Tom Ford
 104, 102  Michael Wild
 104  Jack Lisowski
 103  Sam Baird
 102  David Gilbert
 101  Aditya Mehta
 101  Thepchaiya Un-Nooh
 100  Ian Burns

Televised stage centuries

 143, 102  Cao Yupeng
 135, 113  Neil Robertson
 133, 114, 106, 102  Barry Hawkins
 129, 113  Ding Junhui
 128  Matthew Stevens
 128  Joe Perry

 126, 105  Stephen Lee
 111  Peter Ebdon
 111  Shaun Murphy
 108, 108  Marco Fu
 106  Rory McLeod
 103  Jamie Cope

References

External links 

2012
Australian Goldfields Open
Goldfields Open
Sport in Bendigo